The Varga RMI-1 was a twin-engine turboprop-powered aircraft designed by Hungarian engineer László Varga. It was a fighter-bomber intended to test the new turboprop Jendrassik Cs-1 aero engine. Only one prototype was built, as with the signing of a mutual defence pact between Hungary and Germany in June 1941, it was decided to license produce the Daimler-Benz DB 605 piston engine and purchase the Messerschmitt Me 210 fitted with these engines to fill the fighter-bomber requirement. Due to difficulties with the original engines, the sole prototype was re-engined with German Daimler-Benz DB 605s in 1944 and undertook taxiing trials and high speed runs, but was destroyed by Allied bombing in June 1944 before making its first flight.

Design
The RMI-1 was a low wing, twin-engined aircraft with two turboprop Cs-1 engines slung under the wings. It was designed to have a crew of two or three. The tail section was of the conventional type with a single vertical stabilizer.

Specifications (X/H)

See also 
Hungarian military aircraft from the same era

References

1940s Hungarian aircraft
1940s turboprop engines
Twin-engined aircraft
Fighter-bomber aircraft